Iblis is the name of the devil in Islam.

It may also refer to:

People
 Iblis, former singer with German black-metal band Endstille

Other
 Count Iblis, an exiled alien who was rescued by the Battlestar Galactica and stirred trouble among its crew until he was ejected from the ship
 Garm Bel Iblis, the founder of the Rebel Alliance in the Star Wars franchise
 Iblis Ginjo, a character in the Dune franchise of novels by Brian Herbert and Kevin J. Anderson
 Iblis (film), a 2018 Indian Malayalam-language film
 Iblis, a Frame in the 2002 game Zone of the Enders: The Fist of Mars
 Iblis, a villain in the 2006 video game Sonic the Hedgehog
 Iblis, the name of a weapon in the 2004 computer game World of Warcraft
 Iblis, the name of the mightiest djinn the wizard Ad Avis tries to summon in the 1990 adventure game Quest for Glory II: Trial by Fire by Sierra On-Line

Distinguish from
Idris (disambiguation)